Streblus banksii, commonly known as the large-leaved milk tree or by the Māori name ewekuri, is a species of plant in the family Moraceae that is endemic to New Zealand. The name "milk tree" comes from the milky sap the tree exudes when cut or damaged.

The tree has numerous bright yellow flowers between September and November followed by bright red-orange ovoid fruits.

References

banksii
Flora of New Zealand